Living in Style is a 2011 South Korean weekend family drama series starring Ki Tae-young and Yoon Se-in. It aired on SBS from September 17, 2011 to March 11, 2012, on Saturdays and Sundays at 21:50 for 51 episodes.

Plot
In the first family, Mo Sung-ae struggles to overcome the difficult hand life has dealt her and care for her four children — two of them are angels, but two are selfish little devils.

The Choi family is an affluent family dealing with the recent loss of their patriarch, and a mother trying to retain control of her late husband's assets from her stepson. Choi Shin-hyung, her biological son and chosen successor, is forced to choose between fulfilling her mother's wishes and losing it all for his longtime girlfriend.

The Jo family is a middle-class family led by patriarch Jo Yong-pal, a building security guard, who loves Mo Sung-ae. His jobless, lazy son, Jo Jin-sang, and his daughter-in-law Lee Hae-shim add an endearing, but comical flavor to the group.

These three families struggle to overcome their problems and live in style.

Cast
Na family
Lee Hyo-chun as Mo Sung-ae
Son Hyun-joo as Na Dae-ra
Choi Su-rin as Nam Eun-jung
Kim Hee-jung as Na No-ra
Yoon Se-in as Na Ah-ra
Choi Woo-shik as Na Joo-ra
Kim Ji-min as Na Geum-sung
Nam Da-reum as Na Hwa-sung

Choi family
Park Jung-soo as Chun Yeon-duk
Ki Tae-young as Choi Shin-hyung
Chae Young-in as Choi So-hyung
Yoon Seo-hyun as Choi Goo-hyung

Jo family
Roh Joo-hyun as Jo Yong-pal
Son Jong-beom as Jo Jin-sang
Lee Sang-sook as Lee Hae-shim

Extended cast
Oh Dae-gyu as Shin Ki-han
Lee Jung-gil as Yeon Goo-joong
Kim Min-hyuk as Park Bi-seo
Go Se-won as Jo Eun-kul
Yoo Se-rye as Eun Geum-hee
Jang Se-yoon as Noh Rin-da
Park Yong-soo as Shin Moon-suk
Jang Da-yoon as Lee Pal-pal
Oh Hee-joon as Sa Daek-yook
Yoo Seung-bong as Lee Dae-pal

Cameo
Hyun Young
Ahn Nae-sang
Jo Sung-ha
Song Kyung-chul as Mo Sung-ae's husband 
Kim Hyun-soo as Jo Han-yi
Min Joon-hyun as Choi Goo-hyung's friend

Awards and nominations

References

External links
 

Seoul Broadcasting System television dramas
2011 South Korean television series debuts
2012 South Korean television series endings
Korean-language television shows
Television series by Samhwa Networks